The 2012–13 Segunda División de Futsal season is the 20th season of second-tier futsal in Spain since its inception in 1993.

The season comprises regular season and championship playoff. Regular season started in October 2012 and finished on April 27, 2013.  Top team at standings when finishing to play the regular season is promoted to Primera División while teams that finished between 2nd–6th positions play the promotion playoffs.

On 3 May, LNFS announced the cancellation of promotion playoffs due to Primera División's expansion to 16 teams, so Castell Peñíscola Benicarló and Fuconsa Jaén were promoted to Primera División.

Teams

Regular season standings

ElPozo Ciudad de Murcia is the ElPozo Murcia reserve team, so is ineligible to play in Primera División.
Carnicer Torrejón carries a two-year ban from last season (2011–12) due to refusal to play in Primera División in 2012–13 season, making it ineligible to play the promotion playoff.

Promotion playoffs
Promotion playoffs were cancelled.

Top goal scorers

References

External links
Full schedule
2012–13 season at lnfs.es

See also
2012–13 Primera División de Futsal
2012–13 Copa del Rey de Futsal
Segunda División B de Futsal

2012–13 in Spanish futsal
Futsal2
Segunda División de Futsal seasons